JAXA Engineering Test Satellite ETS-VIII (Kiku 8) was the eighth technology test satellite in a series which started with ETS-1 in 1975 by NASDA. It was launched with the H-2A on December 18, 2006. ETS-VIII was developed by JAXA in cooperation with NICT and NTT. The aim of ETS-VIII was to enable satellite communications with small terminals. Unlike the Iridium satellites for mobile communication, ETS-VIII was positioned at GEO.
However to fulfill the task, it was essential that the satellite carried two very large antennas. It was the first use of the 204 configuration (four strap-on boosters) of the H-IIA launch vehicle.

Timetable
December 20, 2000: Launch of LDREX, a demonstration of the large antenna reflector deployment, aboard Ariane 5.  Deployment failed.
October 14, 2006: Launch of LDREX-2 with the Ariane 5, model antenna deployed successfully.
December 18, 2006: ETS-VIII was launched aboard H-IIA.
December 26, 2006: Both antennas were deployed. 
January 9, 2007: GEO orbit injection.    
May 9, 2007: The satellite switched to normal operation phase. 
January 10, 2017: Decommissioned.

References

Satellites of Japan
Satellites using the DS2000 bus
Spacecraft launched in 2006
Spacecraft launched by H-II rockets
Derelict satellites orbiting Earth